Sonada Degree College, established in 1985, is a general degree college in Sonada, Darjeeling, India. It offers undergraduate courses in arts. It is affiliated to the University of North Bengal.

Departments

Arts

Nepali (Honours)
English (Honours)
History (Honours)
Political Science (Honours)
Philosophy (General)
Education (General)

Accreditation
The college is recognized by the University Grants Commission (UGC).

See also

References

External links
Official website
University of North Bengal
University Grants Commission
National Assessment and Accreditation Council

Universities and colleges in Darjeeling district
Colleges affiliated to University of North Bengal
Educational institutions established in 1985
1985 establishments in West Bengal